Cilento Poetry Prize (Italian: Premio Cilento Poesia), is an Italian literary prize founded in 2017 by the poet, writer and literary critic Menotti Lerro and awarded annually, in the month of August, in Salento Cilento - "The Poetry Village".

Criteria for nomination 
The prize is awarded to "a poet who, during the preceding year, has published a collection of poems already considered relevant to be part of the history of literature, or the same prize is conferred to a distinguished poet for the importance of his/her career”.

Prizes (some cases equal-first) have been awarded as follows
2017 - Davide Rondoni
2018 - Milo de Angelis
2019 - Franco Loi and Roberto Carifi (special winter edition at Accademia di Belle Arti di Brera)
2019 - Giampiero Neri and Vivian Lamarque
2020 - Elio Pecora
2021 - Dacia Maraini
2022 - Valerio Magrelli and Tiziano Rossi

Cilento Prizes for criticism have been awarded as follows
2018 - Francesco D'Episcopo
2019 - Umberto Curi
2020 - Remo Bodei (posthumous)

Institutional sponsorship 
The Cilento Poetry Prize is officially supported by: Regione Campania, Provincia di Salerno, Soprintendenza Archeologia Belle Arti e Paesaggio Salerno e Avellino, Parco Nazionale del Cilento, Vallo di Diano e Alburni.
In 2022 the Prize has been financed by the Italian Ministry of Culture for 140.000 Euro to let it become International.

Bibliography 
Norma De Martino, Premio Cilento Poesia. 1a Edizione. Cronistoria della serata del 10 agosto 2017, p. 301, in "Annali Storici di Principato Citra", A. 15, n. 2.2 (Centro di Promozione Culturale per il Cilento: 2017)
In Menotti Lerro (edited by) La Scuola Empatica: Movimento letterario-artistico-filosofico e culturale sorto in Italia nel 2020 (Ladolfi: 2020), pp. 65–104.
Nicola Nicoletti, "Salento capitale della poesia . A San Lorenzo versi d'autore", 5 agosto 2022, "La Città di Salerno", p. 16.
Davide Speranza, "Cilento Poesia, antologia sotto il firmamento", Il Mattino, p. 28 (09 August 2022).
"Torna Cilento Poesia di Menotti Lerro: Magrelli-Rossi vincono la VII edizione", Affari Italiani (09 August 2022) online edition.

References

External links 

Italian literary awards
Awards established in 2017
2017 establishments in Italy